Walter Minto (1779–1830) was a planter and slave-owner in Jamaica. He was elected to the House of Assembly of Jamaica in 1820.

References 

Members of the House of Assembly of Jamaica
Planters from the British West Indies
1830 deaths
1779 births